This is a list of people who have served as president of Louisiana Tech University, via the Louisiana Tech Department of Special Collections, Archives, and Manuscripts.

Arthur T. Prescott (1895–1899)
W. C. Robinson (1899–1900)
James B. Aswell (1900–1904)
W. E. Taylor (1904–1905)
C. E. Byrd (1906–1907)
John E. Keeny (1908–1926)
John R. Conniff (1927–1928)
George W. Bond (1929–1936)
Edwin Richardson (1936–1941)
Claybrook Cottingham (1941–1949)
Ralph L. Ropp (1949–1962)
F. Jay Taylor (1962–1987)
Dan Reneau (1987–2013)
Les Guice (2013–present)

References 

Louisiana Tech
Louisiana Tech